Sarcohyla labedactyla is a species of frog in the family Hylidae. It is endemic to Mexico.
Its natural habitats are temperate forests and rivers. It is threatened by habitat loss.

References

Amphibians described in 1996
Taxonomy articles created by Polbot
labedactyla